Edward Lozano Duran (September 6, 1925 – November 22, 2019) was an American jazz guitarist from San Francisco. He recorded often with Vince Guaraldi and was a member of the Benny Goodman orchestra during the 1970s.

Career 
Duran started on piano at age seven and switched to guitar at 12. By fifteen he was performing professionally with jazz musicians who visited San Francisco in the 1940s and 1950s. He was in a trio with his brothers, Carlos Duran and Manny Duran, from 1948 to 1952. Beginning in the 1950s, he worked in San Francisco with Chet Baker, Charlie Parker, Red Norvo, George Shearing, and Flip Phillips.

Around 1957, Duran was the guitarist in the CBS Radio Orchestra under the direction of Ray Hackett for the Bill Weaver Show, a variety show broadcast by CBS's San Francisco affiliate, KQW, later renamed KCBS, from the Palace Hotel. While playing with the CBS Orchestra, Duran met Brunell and performed on her debut album, Intro to Jazz of the Italian-American. The album was recorded by San Francisco Jazz Records, a short-lived label that was part of the production of the radio station.

In 1954, his friend, Vince Guaraldi, who had been playing with Cal Tjader, started a trio with Duran and bassist Dean Riley. Guaraldi introduced Tjader to Duran and his two brothers. All three Duran brothers were members of Cal Tjader's Mambo Quintet in the mid 1950s.

In 1958, Duran played a concert at the Marines Memorial Auditorium with Tjader and Stan Getz six years before Getz became famous. The concert was recorded by Fantasy. In an interview, Duran said, "There was no rehearsal before the date, no alternates, no second takes. It went very smoothly. It just kind of fell into place. The feeling was happy and relaxed." Also in 1958, Duran was joined by Manny Duran on Tjader's album San Francisco Moods. Duran led a trio from 1960 to 1967. In 1962, he was joined by Carlos Duran on Benny Velarde's album Ay Que Rico.

From 1976 to 1981, Duran was a member of Benny Goodman's orchestras, which included an acclaimed performance with Goodman's octet at Carnegie Hall on June 28, 1976, in connection with the Newport Jazz Festival. Between 1980 and 1982, Duran recorded with Tania Maria. In the late 1980s, after his last two children had grown, Duran moved to New York City and performed in a quartet that he organized. Duran crossed paths with Getz again in 1983 while recording the Dee Bell studio album, Let There Be Love. On October 19, 1983, he married Madeleine ("Mad") Askew in Sonoma County, California. Mad Duran, who is twenty-eight years younger than Eddie Duran, is a classically trained clarinetist and saxophonist and music educator. Duran and his wife have collaborated on five albums, including From Here to the Moon: Mad and Eddie Duran, which they produced in 1996.

Duran was once a licensed barber.

He died on November 22, 2019 at the age of 94.

Discography

As leader
 Jazz Guitarist (Fantasy, 1957)
 Ginza (Concord Jazz, 1979)
 From Here to the Moon (Mad Eddie, 1997)

As sideman
With Vince Guaraldi
 Vince Guaraldi Trio (Fantasy, 1956)
 A Flower Is a Lovesome Thing (Fantasy, 1958)
 In Person (Fantasy, 1963)
 Jazz Impressions (Fantasy, 1964)
 The Latin Side of Vince Guaraldi (Fantasy, 1964)
 Vince Guaraldi with the San Francisco Boys Chorus (D&D, 1967)
 Oh Good Grief! (Warner Bros.-Seven Arts, 1968)
 The Eclectic Vince Guaraldi (Warner Bros.-Seven Arts, 1969)
 Alma-Ville (Warner Bros.-Seven Arts, 1969)
 North Beach (D&D, 2006)
 An Afternoon with the Vince Guaraldi Quartet (V.A.G. Publishing, 2011)

With Tania Maria
 Piquant (Concord Jazz Picante, 1981)
 Taurus (Concord Jazz Picante, 1982)
 Come with Me (Concord Jazz, Picante 1983)

With Cal Tjader
 San Francisco Moods (Fantasy, 1958)
 Tjader Plays Tjazz (Fantasy, 1956)
 Last Night When We Were Young (Fantasy, 1975)

With others
 Dee Bell, Let There Be Love (Concord Jazz, 1983)
 Dee Bell, One by One (Concord Jazz, 1985)
 Stan Getz, Cal Tjader-Stan Getz Sextet (Fantasy, 1958)
 Benny Goodman Band, Aurex Jazz Festival '80: King of Swing (Eastworld, 1980)
 Jon Hendricks, Tell Me the Truth (Arista, 1975)
 Earl Hines, Fatha Plays Fats (Fantasy, 1956)
 Eiji Kitamura, Teddy Wilson, Cal Tjader, Seven Stars (Concord Jazz, 1982)
 Gus Mancuso, Cal Tjader, Vince Guaraldi, Introducing Gus Mancuso (Fantasy, 1956)

References 
Notes

Inline citations

1925 births
2019 deaths
American jazz guitarists
Hard bop guitarists
Swing guitarists
American jazz composers
American male jazz composers
Guitarists from San Francisco
American male guitarists
20th-century American guitarists
Jazz musicians from San Francisco
20th-century American male musicians